Streatham Hill ward is an administrative division of the London Borough of Lambeth, United Kingdom.  It includes the neighbourhoods in the northern part of Streatham either side of the road of the same name.

Ward Profile
 
The ward boundaries are: 
 north: the A205 South Circular Road along Streatham Place and Christchurch Road; 
 east: Norwood Road;
 south: the boundary between the SW2 and SW16 postcodes - to the west this follows the railway from Streatham Hill station;
 west: boundary with the London Borough of Wandsworth at Tooting Bec Common and Emmanuel Road/New Park Road.

Streatham Hill ward is located in the Streatham Parliamentary constituency.

Lambeth Council elections

External links
Lambeth Borough Council profile for the ward
Streatham Hill ward elections results on Lambeth website

Wards of the London Borough of Lambeth